The 2016–17 Texas Southern Tigers basketball team represented Texas Southern University during the 2016–17 NCAA Division I men's basketball season. The Tigers, led by fifth year head coach Mike Davis, played their home games at the Health and Physical Education Arena in Houston, Texas as members of the Southwestern Athletic Conference. They finished the season 23–12, 16–2 in SWAC play to win the regular season SWAC championship. They defeated Alabama State, Grambling State, and Alcorn State to be champions of the SWAC tournament. They earned the SWAC's automatic bid to the NCAA tournament where they lost in the first round to North Carolina.

Previous season 
The Tigers finished the 2015–16 season 18–15, 16–2 in SWAC play to win the regular season SWAC championship. They defeated Alabama A&M in the quarterfinals of the SWAC tournament to advance to the semifinals where they lost to Southern. As regular season conference champions who failed to win their conference tournament, they received an automatic bid to the National Invitation Tournament where they lost to Valparaiso in the first round.

Roster

Schedule and results

|-
! colspan="9" style=| Non-conference regular season

|-
!colspan=9 style=|SWAC regular season

|-
! colspan="9" style=| SWAC tournament

|-
!colspan=12 style=| NCAA tournament

References

Texas Southern Tigers basketball seasons
Texas Southern
Texas Southern Tigers basketball
Texas Southern Tigers basketball
Texas Southern